Sir Clive Loehnis KCMG (24 August 1902 – 23 May 1992) was a director of the British signals intelligence agency, GCHQ, a post he held from 1960 to 1964.

Career
Loehnis was born in 1902 in Chelsea, London. His father, Herman Loehnis, was born in New York, but had become a naturalised British citizen and became a barrister.

Clive Loehnis attended Lockers Park School and then became a Royal Navy officer cadet, training at the Royal Naval College, Osborne, and graduating from the Royal Naval College, Dartmouth, and the Royal Naval College, Greenwich. He became qualified in signals in 1928 and left the Navy in 1935. In 1938 he returned to the Signals Division of the Admiralty, where he earned the silver oak leaves of a commander before retiring in 1942 and going into the Naval Intelligence Division. When he was demobilised after the war, he joined GCHQ, at that time a semi-covert division of the Foreign Office.

Loehnis was appointed deputy to Sir Eric Jones in 1954. When Jones retired in 1960, Loehis was promoted to the directorship, which he held until 1964. He was knighted in 1962.

Loehnis married Rosemary Ryder in 1929, and the marriage produced a son and a daughter. After leaving GCHQ Loehnis retired to Belgravia, where he died in May 1992.

References 

1902 births
1992 deaths
Directors of the Government Communications Headquarters
People educated at Lockers Park School
People from Chelsea, London
Royal Navy officers